Batfish may refer to:

Fish
 California batfish or bat ray (Myliobatis californicus), an eagle ray from the East Pacific
Red lipped batfish or the galapagos batfish
 Ogcocephalidae, a family of anglerfish found in oceans worldwide
 Platax, a spadefish genus from the Indian and Pacific Oceans, and sometimes kept in aquariums
 Freshwater batfish (Myxocyprinus asiaticus), better known as the Chinese high fin banded shark, a catostomid sometimes kept in aquariums and aquaculture
 Members of the genus Halieutaea

Other uses
The Batfish Boys, a UK rock group who later shortened their name to Batfish
, two submarines of the US Navy